The World War I Victory Medal (known prior to establishment of the World War II Victory Medal in 1945 simply as the Victory Medal) was a United States service medal designed by James Earle Fraser of New York City under the direction of the Commission of Fine Arts.

Award of a common allied service medal was recommended by an inter-allied committee in March 1919. Each allied nation would design a 'Victory Medal' for award to their military personnel, all issues having certain common features, including a winged figure of victory on the obverse and the same ribbon.

The Victory Medal was originally intended to be established by an act of Congress. The bill authorizing the medal never passed, however, thus leaving the military departments to establish it through general orders. The War Department published orders in April 1919, and the Navy in June of the same year.

Criteria
The Victory Medal was awarded to military personnel for service between April 6, 1917, and November 11, 1918, or with either of the following expeditions:
 American Expeditionary Forces in European Russia between November 12, 1918, and August 5, 1919.
 American Expeditionary Forces Siberia between November 23, 1918, and April 1, 1920.

Design
The front of the bronze medal features a winged Victory holding a shield and sword on the front. The back of the bronze medal features "The Great War For Civilization" in all capital letters curved along the top of the medal. Curved along the bottom of the back of the medal are six stars, three on either side of the center column of seven staffs wrapped in a cord. The top of the staff has a round ball on top and is winged on the side. The staff is on top of a shield that says "U" on the left side of the staff and "S" on the right side of the staff. On left side of the staff it lists one World War I Allied country per line: France, Italy, Serbia, Japan, Montenegro, Russia, and Greece. On the right side of the staff the Allied country names read: Great Britain, Belgium, Brazil, Portugal, Rumania (spelled with a U instead of an O as it is spelled now), and China.

Devices
To denote battle participation and campaign credit, the World War I Victory Medal was authorized with a large variety of devices to denote specific accomplishments. In order of seniority, the devices authorized to the World War I Victory Medal were as follows:

Citation Star
The Citation Star to the World War I Victory Medal was authorized by the United States Congress on February 4, 1919. A  inch silver star was authorized to be worn on the ribbon of the Victory Medal for any member of the U.S. Army who had been cited for gallantry in action between 1917 and 1920. In 1932, the Citation Star ("Silver Star") was redesigned and renamed the Silver Star Medal and, upon application to the United States War Department, any holder of the Silver Star Citation could have it converted to a Silver Star medal.

Navy Commendation Star
The Navy Commendation Star to the World War I Victory Medal was authorized to any person who had been commended by the Secretary of the Navy for performance of duty during the First World War. A  inch silver star was worn on the World War I Victory Medal, identical in appearance to the Army's Citation Star. Unlike the Army's version, however, the Navy Commendation Star could not be upgraded to the Silver Star medal.

Army Battle Clasps
The following battle clasps, inscribed with a battle's name, were worn on the medal to denote participation in major ground conflicts.

For general defense service, not involving a specific battle, the "Defensive Sector" Battle Clasp was authorized. The clasp was also awarded for any battle which was not already recognized by its own battle clasp.

The World War I Victory Medal bears the clasps of the battles the U.S. Army participated in across the ribbon. Not all battles are shown on the bar clasps. Only the battles designated as battles that would have bars issued were shown on the medal. The famous Battle of Chateau Thierry to hold the Chateau and the bridge as a joint effort between the US Army and the US Marines against the German machine gunners did not get awarded clasps.

As commander of the American Expeditionary Forces, General John J. Pershing received all 14 clasps.  His medal is in the National Museum of American History.

Navy Battle Clasps
Navy battle clasps were issued for naval service in support of Army operations and had identical names to the Army battle clasps. There was a slight variation of the criteria dates for the Navy battle clasps, as listed below.

The Defensive Sector Clasp was also authorized for Navy personnel who had participated in naval combat but were not authorized a particular battle clasp.

Navy Operational Clasps
For sea-related war duty, the Navy issued the following operational clasps, which were worn on the World War I Victory Medal and inscribed with the name of the duty type which had been performed:

Unlike the army, the navy only allowed one clasp of any type to be worn on the ribbon.  Members of the marine or medical corps who served in France but was not eligible for a battle clasp would receive a bronze Maltese cross on their ribbons.

Army Service Clasps
For non-combat service with the army during the First World War, the following service clasps were authorized to be worn with the World War I Victory Medal. Each service clasp was inscribed with a country or region name where support service was performed. The U.S. Army issued the following service clasps:

Navy Service Clasps
The U.S. Navy issued similar service clasps to the Army for service in the following regions during the following periods:

Campaign Stars

Since battle and service clasps could only be worn on the full-sized World War I Victory Medal, 3/16 inch bronze service stars were authorized for wear on the award ribbon. This was the common method of campaign and battle display when wearing the World War I Victory Medal as a ribbon on a military uniform.

Maltese Cross
Medals issued to U.S. Marines were issued with a Maltese cross device affixed to the ribbon.

Lapel button
The World War I Victory Button (known prior to establishment of the World War II Victory Medal simply as the Victory Button) was a lapel button designed for wear on civilian clothes and consisted of a five-pointed star 5/8-inch in diameter on a wreath with the letters “U.S.” in the center. For persons wounded in action, the lapel button was silver; for all others, the lapel button was bronze. The Victory Button was designed by the sculptor, Adolph Alexander Weinman of New York City under the supervision of the Commission of Fine Arts.

The World War I Victory Button on a narrow circular band of blue enamel, containing the words “American Legion” in gold letters, forms the central element of the American Legion emblem. It was adopted by the National Executive Committee of the American Legion on July 9, 1919, as the official insignia of the national organization of American veterans.

Distribution
The World War I Victory Medals were awarded after the end of World War I, so they were mailed to the servicemen instead of awarded in person. For example, the boxes containing the Victory Medals for United States Army World War I veterans were mailed out by the depot officer at the General Supply Depot, U.S. Army, in Philadelphia, Pennsylvania, in April 1921. An outer light brown box with an address label glued to it and its postage area marked "OFFICIAL BUSINESS, Penalty for private use $300" contained an inner white box stamped with the bars the serviceman was supposed to receive on his medal. The inner white box contained the medal, which was wrapped in tissue paper.

Only after filling out the application form A.G.O. No. 740 with the help of an authorized officer could it be officially forwarded to the Philadelphia Quartermaster Intermediate Depot for the veteran then to receive his medal by mail. The Army started issuing Victory Medals on June 21, 1920, not April 1921 as listed above. The Navy had a late start due to production issues and started in August 1920.

Allied and associated nations
Not only did the United States establish a World War I Victory Medal, but so did a significant number of allied and associated nations involved in the conflict against the Dual Alliance between Austria and Germany. The proposition of such a common award was first made by French Maréchal Ferdinand Foch who was supreme commander of the Allied Forces during the First World War. Each bronze Victory Medal has the same diameter (36 mm) and ribbon (double rainbow), but with a national design representing a winged victory.

Main source:

See also 
 Awards and decorations of the United States military
 Silver Citation Star
 World War II Victory Medal (United States)

Notes

References

External links
 

1919 establishments in the United States
Awards established in 1919
United States
United States service medals
Works by James Earle Fraser (sculptor)